In computer science, online machine learning is a method of machine learning in which data becomes available in a sequential order and is used to update the best predictor for future data at each step, as opposed to batch learning techniques which generate the best predictor by learning on the entire training data set at once. Online learning is a common technique used in areas of machine learning where it is computationally infeasible to train over the entire dataset, requiring the need of out-of-core algorithms. It is also used in situations where it is necessary for the algorithm to dynamically adapt to new patterns in the data, or when the data itself is generated as a function of time, e.g., stock price prediction.
Online learning algorithms may be prone to catastrophic interference, a problem that can be addressed by incremental learning approaches.

Introduction 
In reality, the learner never knows the true distribution  over instances. Instead, the learner usually has access to a training set of examples . The ideal goal is to select a function , where  is a space of functions called a hypothesis space, so that some notion of total loss is minimised. Depending on the type of model (statistical or adversarial), one can devise different notions of loss, which lead to different learning algorithms.

Statistical view of online learning 
In statistical learning models, the training sample  are assumed to have been drawn from the true distribution  and the objective is to minimize the expected "risk"

A common paradigm in this situation is to estimate a function  through empirical risk minimization or regularized empirical risk minimization (usually Tikhonov regularization). The choice of loss function here gives rise to several well-known learning algorithms such as regularized least squares and support vector machines.
A purely online model in this category would learn based on just the new input , the current best predictor  and some extra stored information (which is usually expected to have storage requirements independent of training data size). In this case, the space requirements are no longer guaranteed to be constant since it requires storing all previous data points, but the solution may take less time to compute with the addition of a new data point, as compared to batch learning techniques.

A common strategy to overcome the above issues is to learn using mini-batches, which process a small batch of  data points at a time, this can be considered as pseudo-online learning for  much smaller than the total number of training points. Mini-batch techniques are used with repeated passing over the training data to obtain optimized out-of-core versions of machine learning algorithms, for example, stochastic gradient descent. When combined with backpropagation, this is currently the de facto training method for training artificial neural networks.

Example: linear least squares 

The simple example of linear least squares is used to explain a variety of ideas in online learning. The ideas are general enough to be applied to other settings, for example, with other convex loss functions.

Batch learning 
Consider the setting of supervised learning with  being a linear function to be learned:
 
The goal is to compute the filter vector .
To this end, a square loss function 
 
is used to compute the vector  that minimizes the empirical loss
  
where
 .

Assuming that the covariance matrix  is invertible (otherwise it is preferential to proceed in a similar fashion with Tikhonov regularization), the best solution  to the linear least squares problem is given by
 .

When there are  total points in the dataset, to recompute the solution after the arrival of every datapoint , the naive approach will have a total complexity .

Online learning: recursive least squares
The recursive least squares (RLS) algorithm considers an online approach to the least squares problem.
 
 

The proof also shows that . 
One can look at RLS also in the context of adaptive filters (see RLS).

For the case when  is not invertible, consider the regularised version of the problem 
loss function .

Stochastic gradient descent

When this  
  
is replaced by
  

However, the stepsize  needs to be chosen carefully to solve the expected risk minimization problem, as detailed above. By choosing a decaying step size  one can prove the convergence of the average iterate . This setting is a special case of stochastic optimization, a well known problem in optimization.

Incremental stochastic gradient descent
In practice, one can perform multiple stochastic gradient passes (also called cycles or epochs) over the data. The algorithm thus obtained is
called incremental gradient method and corresponds to an iteration
  
The main difference with the stochastic gradient method is that here a sequence  is chosen to decide which training point is visited in the -th step. Such a sequence can be stochastic or deterministic. The number of iterations is then decoupled to the number of points (each point can be considered more than once). The incremental gradient method can be shown to provide a minimizer to the empirical risk. Incremental techniques can be advantageous when considering objective functions made up of a sum of many terms e.g. an empirical error corresponding to a very large dataset.

Kernel methods

Kernels can be used to extend the above algorithms to non-parametric models (or models where the parameters form an infinite dimensional space). The corresponding procedure will no longer be truly online and instead involve storing all the data points, but is still faster than the brute force method.
This discussion is restricted to the case of the square loss, though it can be extended to any convex loss.
  
where  and the sequence  satisfies the recursion:
 
  and
 
 .
Now, if  a general kernel  is introduced instead and let the predictor be 
 
then the same proof will also show that predictor minimising the least squares loss is obtained by changing the above recursion to
 
The above expression requires storing all the data for updating .
Thus, the use of the kernel has allowed the movement from a finite dimensional parameter space  to a possibly infinite dimensional feature represented by a kernel  by instead performing the recursion on the space of parameters , whose dimension is the same as the size of the training dataset. In general, this is a consequence of the representer theorem.

Online convex optimization 
Online convex optimization (OCO)  is a general framework for decision making which leverages convex optimization to allow for efficient algorithms. The framework is that of repeated game playing as follows:

For 
 Learner receives input 
 Learner outputs  from a fixed convex set 
 Nature sends back a convex loss function . 
 Learner suffers loss  and updates its model

The goal is to minimize regret, or the difference between cumulative loss and the loss of the best fixed point   in hindsight.
As an example, consider the case of online least squares linear regression. Here, the weight vectors come from the convex set , and nature sends back the convex loss function .

Some online prediction problems however cannot fit in the framework of OCO. For example, in online classification, the prediction domain and the loss functions are not convex. In such scenarios, two simple techniques for convexification are used: randomisation and surrogate loss functions.

Some simple online convex optimisation algorithms are:

Follow the leader (FTL)
The simplest learning rule to try is to select (at the current step) the hypothesis that has the least loss over all past rounds. This algorithm is called Follow the leader, and is simply given round  by:
 
This method can thus be looked as a greedy algorithm. However, similar bounds cannot be obtained for the FTL algorithm for other important families of models like online linear optimization. To do so, one modifies FTL by adding regularisation.

Follow the regularised leader (FTRL)
This is a natural modification of FTL that is used to stabilise the FTL solutions and obtain better regret bounds. A regularisation function   is chosen and learning performed in round  as follows:
 
As a special example, consider the case of online linear optimisation i.e. where nature sends back loss functions of the form . Also, let . Suppose the regularisation function  is chosen for some positive number . Then, one can show that the regret minimising iteration becomes 
 

 
This algorithm is known as lazy projection, as the vector  accumulates the gradients. It is also known as Nesterov's dual averaging algorithm.

Online subgradient descent (OSD) 

The above proved a regret bound for linear loss functions .

Initialise parameter 

For 
 Predict using , receive  from nature.
 Choose  
 If , update as 
 If , project cumulative gradients onto  i.e.  
One can use the OSD algorithm to derive  regret bounds for the online version of SVM's for classification, which use the hinge loss

Other algorithms 
Quadratically regularised FTRL algorithms lead to lazily projected gradient algorithms as described above. To use the above for arbitrary convex functions and regularisers, one uses online mirror descent.  The optimal regularization in hindsight can be derived for linear loss functions, this leads to the AdaGrad algorithm.

Continual learning 

Continual learning means constantly improving the learned model by  processing continuous
streams of information.
Continual learning capabilities are essential for software systems and autonomous agents interacting in an ever changing real world.
However, continual learning is a challenge for machine learning and neural network models since the continual acquisition of incrementally available information from non-stationary data distributions
generally leads to catastrophic forgetting.

Interpretations of online learning 
The paradigm of online learning has different interpretations depending on the choice of the learning model, each of which has distinct implications about the predictive quality of the sequence of functions . The prototypical stochastic gradient descent algorithm is used for this discussion. As noted above, its recursion is given by
 

The first interpretation consider the stochastic gradient descent method as applied to the problem of minimizing the expected risk  defined above. This interpretation is also valid in the case of a finite training set; although with multiple passes through the data the gradients are no longer independent, still complexity results can be obtained in special cases.

The second interpretation applies to the case of a finite training set and considers the SGD algorithm as an instance of incremental gradient descent method. In this case, one instead looks at the empirical risk:
 

Implementations 
 Vowpal Wabbit: Open-source fast out-of-core online learning system which is notable for supporting a number of machine learning reductions, importance weighting and a selection of different loss functions and optimisation algorithms. It uses the hashing trick for bounding the size of the set of features independent of the amount of training data.
 scikit-learn: Provides out-of-core implementations of algorithms for
 Classification: Perceptron, SGD classifier, Naive bayes classifier.
 Regression: SGD Regressor, Passive Aggressive regressor.
 Clustering: Mini-batch k-means.
 Feature extraction: Mini-batch dictionary learning, Incremental PCA.

See also

Learning paradigms
 Incremental learning
 Lazy learning
 Offline learning, the opposite model
 Reinforcement learning
 Multi-armed bandit
 Supervised learning

General algorithms
 Online algorithm
 Online optimization
 Streaming algorithm
 Stochastic gradient descent

Learning models
 Adaptive Resonance Theory
 Hierarchical temporal memory
 k-nearest neighbor algorithm
 Learning vector quantization
 Perceptron

References

External links
6.883: Online Methods in Machine Learning: Theory and Applications. Alexander Rakhlin. MIT
Machine learning algorithms